The Larmer Tree Festival near Tollard Royal on the Wiltshire–Dorset border is a music and arts festival which has taken place annually since 1990. There are several different stages and areas, and many diverse forms of music, performance (including comedy acts and street theatre) and workshops can be found on site.

2008 line-up
The festival ran from Wednesday 12 July to Sunday 16 July 2008.

2007 line-up
The festival ran from Wednesday 11 July to Sunday 15 July 2007.

2006 line-up
The festival ran from Wednesday 12 July to Sunday 16 July 2006.

2003 line-up
The festival ran from Thursday 17 July to Sunday 20 July 2003.

References

Music festivals in Wiltshire
Music festivals in Dorset